Lupinus peirsonii is a rare species of lupine known by the common names Peirson's lupine and long lupine. It is endemic to the San Gabriel Mountains of Los Angeles County, California, where it grows in woodland and forest habitat. It is an erect, branching perennial herb growing 30 to 60 centimeters tall. Each palmate leaf is made up of 5 to 8 fleshy leaflets up to 7 centimeters long. The herbage is coated in silvery silky hairs. The inflorescence is a raceme of whorled yellow flowers each about a centimeter in length. The fruit is a silky-haired legume pod 3 or 4 centimeters long.

External links
Jepson Manual Treatment
Photo gallery

peirsonii
Endemic flora of California
Natural history of the California chaparral and woodlands
Natural history of Los Angeles County, California
Natural history of the Transverse Ranges
~
Flora without expected TNC conservation status